Thumb Lake, also known as Lake Louise by the "Lake Louise Camp" community, is a kettle lake located in Hudson Township, Charlevoix County, Michigan. The epithet Thumb Lake derives from the lake's bathymetry. An islet protrudes from the lake's west basin.

The misnomer "Lake Louise" comes from a former Camp director who wanted to rename the lake after his wife.

Because of its depth and the dearth of run-off into the lake, its waters are exceptionally clear. The lake is inhabited by splake, a stocked hybrid species (lake trout and brook trout), rainbow trout, yellow perch, smallmouth bass, northern pike, largemouth bass, smelt, and other panfish. Public access is available on the eastern shore of the lake in the form of a park with swimming beach, and on the southwestern shore in the form of a boat launch.

See also
List of lakes in Michigan

External links
Thumb Lake Inventory Map, produced and published by the Institute for Fisheries Research (IFR)

References

Lakes of Charlevoix County, Michigan
Lakes of Michigan